Mendawai River or Katingan River is a river of Borneo, it is located in Central Kalimantan, Indonesia. The longhouses of the Pendahara are located along the river in its upper course. The river has its source in the Schwaner Mountain Range.

Geography
The river flows in the southeast area of Borneo with predominantly tropical rainforest climate (designated as Af in the Köppen-Geiger climate classification). The annual average temperature in the area is 22 °C. The warmest month is September, when the average temperature is around 24 °C, and the coldest is December, at 20 °C. The average annual rainfall is 2991 mm. The wettest month is December, with an average of 476 mm rainfall, and the driest is September, with 75 mm rainfall.

See also
List of rivers of Indonesia
List of rivers of Kalimantan

References

Rivers of Central Kalimantan
Rivers of Indonesia